Ilnur Gizatullin (born May 13, 1969) is a Soviet and Russian former professional ice hockey forward. He is a one-time Russian Champion.  After completing his career as a player, he became a coach.

Awards and honors

References

1972 births
Living people
Ak Bars Kazan players
Neftyanik Almetyevsk players
HC CSKA Moscow players
HKMK Bled players
HC Khimik Voskresensk players
Russian ice hockey forwards
Soviet ice hockey forwards
SKA-Sverdlovsk players
Sportspeople from Kazan
Tatar sportspeople
Russian ice hockey coaches
Russian expatriate ice hockey people
Russia men's national ice hockey team coaches
Russian expatriate sportspeople in Slovenia
Expatriate ice hockey players in Slovenia